BK Skonto is the name of a former professional basketball club that was based in Riga, Latvia.

History
BK Skonto was founded in 2001 as a basketball section of FC Skonto. Basketball club was created by FC Skonto president Guntis Indriksons and basketball legend Valdis Valters. Skonto took the place in Latvian Basketball League from BK Brocēni, other basketball club from Riga, which stopped to exist in 2001. Skonto's main focus was developing young Latvian talents and they did so by giving opportunity to rising stars such as Andris Biedriņš, Kristaps Valters, Jānis Blūms, Sandis Valters, Kaspars Bērziņš, Kristaps Janičenoks and others.

Skonto lasted three seasons and in every one of them made it to Latvian league finals, where they lost to BK Ventspils. In 2004 club's president Guntis Indriksons announced that he won't continue to support club and BK Skonto's existence stopped.

Season by season record

Notable players

Head coaches
 Valdis Valters
 Raivo Otersons
 Guntis Endzels

References

Basketball teams in Latvia
Sport in Riga
Basketball teams established in 2001
Basketball teams disestablished in 2004